The Christian Camp and Conference Association (CCCA) is a national non-profit Christian organization that is composed of member camps across the United States. It is a member of Christian Camping International (CCI), a collection of Christian camps around the world. The CCCA publishes InSight magazine and Flint & Steel e-newsletter. CCCA’s mission is to maximize ministry for member camps and conference centers.

History
Several regional groups of Christian camp and Bible conference leaders in the United States and Canada began to meet informally in the late 1940s and early 1950s. These independent coalitions later combined their efforts under the name Christian Camp and Conference Association International, and eventually incorporated in 1963.

As the association’s influence spread, the name was changed to Christian Camping International (CCI). In 2005, the leadership of CCI/USA decided to eliminate the often misleading term "camping" from the organization's name, and return to Christian Camp and Conference Association (CCCA). Today, CCCA is the largest of 21 autonomous associations on six continents. Most major denominations and church associations, as well as many nationally recognized youth and adult ministries, are represented in CCCA. About half of the nearly 900 member camps and centers are independent organizations.

Every year, more than 5.5 million people are involved in the programs of CCCA member camps and conference centers.

References

External links
Official Website of CCCA
Christian Camping International

Summer camps in the United States
Christian organizations based in the United States